Sir Daniel Lleufer Thomas (29 August 1863 – 8 August 1940) was a Welsh magistrate, social reformer, and writer.

Thomas was born on 29 August 1863 at Llethr Enoch, Cwm-du, Talley, the third child of William and Esther Thomas, at Llethr Enoch, Cwm-du, in the parish of Llandeilo-fawr.

In 1890 he was nominated to be Liberal candidate for the vacancy in East Carmarthenshire following the death of David Pugh but he withdrew before the selection conference.

In 1891 he began contributing to the Dictionary of National Biography.

He was knighted in February 1931.  His portrait was painted by Margaret Lindsay Williams in 1938 and currently resides in the National Museum Wales.

References

External links

 Thomas, Sir Daniel Lleufer in the Welsh Biography Online

1863 births
1940 deaths
Welsh scholars and academics
British social reformers